Illiberis is a genus of moths belonging to the family Zygaenidae.

The species of this genus are found in Southeastern Asia.

Species

Species:
 Illiberis albiventris Alberti, 1954
 Illiberis aomoriensis  Matsumura, 1927
 Illiberis arisana  Matsumura, 1911
 Illiberis assimilis  Jordan, 1907
 Illiberis consimilis  Leech, 1898
 Illiberis coreana  Matsumura, 1927
 Illiberis cyanecula  Herrich-Schäffer, 1855
 Illiberis cyanocera  Hampson, 1892
 Illiberis cybele  Leech, 1888
 Illiberis diaphana  Hampson, 1892
 Illiberis dirce  Leech, 1888
 Illiberis distinctus  Kardakoff, 1928
 Illiberis elegans  Poujade, 1886
 Illiberis ellenae  Alberti, 1954
 Illiberis endocyanea  Hampson, 1919
 Illiberis formosensis  Strand, 1915
 Illiberis fujisana  Matsumura, 1927
 Illiberis fumata  Alberti, 1954
 Illiberis glaucosquamata  Strand, 1915
  Illiberis heringi  Draeseke, 1926
 Illiberis honei  Alberti, 1954
 Illiberis horishana  Matsumura, 1931
 Illiberis horni  Strand, 1915
 Illiberis hyalina  Staudinger, 1887
 Illiberis ignea  Oberthür, 1894
 Illiberis inermis  Alberti, 1954
 Illiberis kardakoffi  Alberti, 1951
 Illiberis kaszabi  Daniel, 1970
 Illiberis laeva  Püngeler, 1914
 Illiberis nigra  Leech, 1888
 Illiberis nigrigemma  Walker, 1854
 Illiberis ochracea  Leech, 1898
 Illiberis paracybele  Alberti, 1954
 Illiberis paradistincta  Alberti, 1954
 Illiberis phacusana  Strand, 1915
 Illiberis pruni  Dyar, 1905
 Illiberis pseudopsychina  Alberti, 1951
 Illiberis psychina  Oberthür, 1890
 Illiberis rotundata  Jordan, 1907
 Illiberis serrata  Alberti, 1954
 Illiberis shensiensis  Alberti, 1954
 Illiberis silvestris  Strand, 1915
 Illiberis sinensis  Walker, 1854
 Illiberis taikozana  Matsumura, 1927
 Illiberis tenuis  Butler, 1877
 Illiberis translucida  Poujade, 1885
 Illiberis transvena  Jordan, 1907
 Illiberis ulmivora  Graeser, 1888
 Illiberis ussuriensis  Alberti, 1951
 Illiberis vitrea  Jordan, 1908
 Illiberis yunnanensis  Alberti, 1951

References

Zygaenidae
Zygaenidae genera